The MACM, the Mougins Museum of Classical Art (Musée d’Art Classique de Mougins) is an art museum located in the village of Mougins, in the Alpes-Maritimes department, France. It is 30 minutes from Nice airport and 15 minutes from the centre of Cannes.

The MACM opened to the public in June 2011. The museum has won several international awards and has loaned dozens of objects to other museums and university exhibitions all over the world.

The museum’s large and diverse collection of antiquities includes Roman, Greek and Egyptian sculpture, vases, coins, and jewellery, and the world’s largest private collection of ancient arms and armour .

The ancient artworks are interspersed with paintings, drawings, and sculptures by artists such as Henri Matisse, Marc Chagall, Raoul Dufy, Paul Cézanne, Auguste Rodin, Salvador Dalí, Andy Warhol, Marc Quinn, Antony Gormley, and Damien Hirst, and others. The collection also includes works by artists who spent time in Mougins, such as Francis Picabia, Jean Cocteau, Man Ray, and Pablo Picasso (who spent the final 12 years of his life in Mougins village).

The founder of the museum is Christian Levett, a British investment manager with an interest in history and art. A collector since childhood, in 2009 he formed the museum to place his antiquity and classical art collection on public display. The Musée de Mougins was created by remodelling a 600m2 medieval edifice to house his collection. The building itself used to be the village prison in medieval times, it was then turned into a mill before becoming a private residence in the 1950s.  The interior was entirely renovated to display the collection while the façade remains in its original style.

The museum’s director is Leisa Paoli.

Concept 
Although the majority of objects on display are antiquities, the museum embraces a concept of displaying ancient, neo-classical, modern and contemporary art side by side to show the pervasive and lasting influence of the ancient world. Thus works by Sir Peter Paul Rubens, Marc Chagall, Henri Matisse, Damien Hirst and others are included in the museum alongside their ancient inspirations.

This dialogue and fusion between ancient and modern is particularly clear in the museum where, for example, depictions of the Greek Goddess Aphrodite by Warhol, Dalí and Yves Klein accompany 1st and 2nd century AD depictions of the Goddess, in marble and in bronze.

History 
Founder, Christian Levett, a philanthropist in the field, sponsored multiple exhibitions at The British Museum, Royal Academy, National Gallery, Sir John Soane’s Museum and the Ashmolean Museum in Oxford. He has funded archaeological works in the UK, Spain, Italy and Egypt and sponsored academic scholarships at Wolfson College and The Ruskin School of Art in Oxford. He has aided curatorial funding at The Ashmolean, The British Museum, and The British School at Rome.

As well as this, he has funded renovation works at The Charterhouse Museum London, Charterhouse School Surrey, The National Gallery and the chapel Notre Dame de Vie in Mougins, and has sponsored conferences at King’s College London, Senate House UCL and at The Mougins Museum. He is a member of the Arms and Armour Committee at The Metropolitan Museum of New York and member of The Board of Visitors at The Ashmolean Museum Oxford and is a past board member of The Hadrian’s Wall Trust. Levett is also an Honorary Fellow of The Ashmolean Museum, an honorary fellow of Wolfson College Oxford and a member of the Oxford University Chancellors Court of Benefactors.

On 29 October 2019, Levett consigned for sale at Christie's a marble statue of the Emperor Hadrian from his collection, known as the Cobham Hall Hadrian, to benefit the Museum.

Collection 
The MACM is spread over four floors chronologically from the crypt to the second floor as follows: The Egyptian Gallery, in the crypt, depicts the theme of the afterlife with funerary masks, numerous other ancient artefacts and a sarcophagus, punctuated with works from Chagall, Calder, Rubens and Cocteau. The People and Personalities Gallery on the ground floor presents busts and statues of historical figures from ancient Greece and Rome, their influence highlighted by sculptures of Sosno, Arman, Quinn and Hirst. The Gods and Goddesses Gallery, on the first floor, displays Greek and Roman bronze and marble statues, heads and busts, pottery, glass and silverware, an extensive collection of coins and an antique jewellery display case. Works by neo-classical and modern artists such as Renoir, Rodin, Klein, Warhol, Picasso, Modigliani, Braque and Dalí are also exhibited in the museum. The Armoury, on the second floor, displays the largest private collection of Greek and Roman arms and armour in the world.

Publications 
The MACM has produced several publications, including:
Mougins Museum of Classical Art, 2011, edited by M. Merrony
La Collection Famille Levett, 2012, edited by M. Merrony and translated by C. Dauphin
Animals in the Ancient World, 2014, C. Dauphin
Pompeii in Pictures, 2015, K. Schörle
Les Animaux dans le Monde Antique, 2016, C. Dauphin
Dufy Dessine le Sud, 2019, F. Guillon Laffaille

Exhibitions 
The permanent collection at the MACM is constantly evolving. New pieces are acquired with a view to sustaining and developing the museum’s concept of the fusion of ancient and modern art and the influence that Antiquity has had on subsequent artistic creation.
The Museum has also hosted and been otherwise involved in many temporary exhibitions:

Exhibitions at the MACM 
Doric, Sean Scully. 12 July - 29 September 2013
Vessels, Gary Komarin. 1 May – 29 June 2014
Layers of Time, Alexander Mihaylovich. 10 April - 14 June 2015
Pompeii in pictures, Giorgio Sommer. 19 June – 2 August 2015
Animal, The Levett Bestiary collection. February – June 2016
Past is present, Léo Caillard. 16 March – 27 May 2018
Bleu-Topique, Johan Van Mullem. 16 November 2018 – 17 March 2019
Dufy dessine le Sud (Dufy depicts the South), Raoul Dufy. 23 March - 1 September 2019
Jean Cocteau & Sa Mythologie (Jean Cocteau & His Mythology), 11 September 2020 – 24 January 2021 (extended to 27 June 2021) 
VANITAS, 15 October 2021 – 30 January 2021

'Hors Les Murs' external exhibitions
Mythes et Héros (Myths and Heroes), 14 April – 28 May 2012 
A collaboration with the town of Mougins at the Espace Culturel de Mougins

 Picasso à Mougins (Picasso in Mougins), 28 March – 12 May 2013
A collaboration with the town of Mougins at the Espace Culturel de Mougins

Picasso at the Mas Candille, Lucien Clergue, 15 – 26 May 2013 
A collaboration with the 5* Relais & Chateaux hotel Le Mas Candille at Le Mas Candille, Mougins

Sacha Sosno. Un hommage, 8 May – 15 June 2014
A collaboration with the town of Mougins at the Espace Culturel de Mougins

Mougins Monumental 2015, 4 April – 30 August 2015 
A collaboration with the town of Mougins - open air exhibition in Mougins Village

Ici et maintenant (Here and now), 15 September – 31 December 2016 
A collaboration between the FRAC, the town of Mougins, and the association MVE (Mougins Village Energy).

Mougins Monumental 2016, 5 March – 29 May 2016
A collaboration with the town of Mougins - open air exhibition in Mougins Village

The Classical Now, 2 March – 28 April 2018
A collaboration with King’s College of London at The Arcade at Bush House & The Inigo Rooms, Somerset House East Wing King’s College London, UK

Napoléon. L’héritage Napoléonien de l’Égypte à nos jours ("Napoleon and his legacy from Egypt to the present day") 5 July –  30 Septembre 2021 
A collaboration with the town of Mougins- Espace Culturel de Mougins

Loans
The MACM's important loan programme has seen numerous artefacts and artworks on loan to the following establishments:
 Art Institute Chicago, Chicago, United States of America 
Braunschweigisches Landesmuseum, Brunswick, Germany 
British Museum, London, UK 
Espace d’Art Concret, Mouans Sartoux, France 
Estorick Collection of Modern Italian Art, London, UK 
Fondation Pierre-Gianadda, Martigny, Switzerland 
Fondazione Prada, Venice, Italy 
Kellos Gallery, London, UK 
King's College London, London, UK
Musée d’Archéologie Méditerranéenne, La Vieille Charité, Marseille, France 
Musée d’Archéologie de Nice, France 
Musée de la Légion Étrangère, Aubagne, France 
Musée Massena, Nice, France 
Musée National du Sport, Nice, France 
Musée National Marc Chagall, Nice, France 
Musée Regards de Provence, Marseille, France 
Musée Saint-Raymond, Toulouse, France 
Römisch-Germanisches Museum, Cologne, Germany 
Royal Academy of Arts, London, UK 
Sao Paulo Museum of Modern Art (MASP), São Paulo, Brazil 
Segedunum Roman Fort, Wallsend, UK 
Sir John Soane’s Museum, London, UK 
The J. Paul Getty Museum, Los Angeles, USA 
The Jewish Museum, New York, USA 
Tullie House Museum & Art Gallery, Carlisle, UK 
Vindolanda Trust Fort and Museum, Hexham, UK 
The Wallace Collection, London, UK
Walters Art Museum, Baltimore, USA

Prizes and accolades
Winner of the Apollo’s Museum Opening of the Year award in 2011.
Winner of the Nouveau Tourisme Culturel award Ken d’Or 2012. 
Nominated for the European Museum of the Year award 2013
Nominated in the Virtual Reality/Augmented Reality category at the CLIC Patrimoine and Innovation(s) 2017 awards.
TripAdvisor’s Certificates of Excellence in 2012, 2013, 2014, 2015, 2016, 2017 and 2018
Obtained the government-approved brand ‘Quality Tourism’ in 2016.

See also
Mougins Center of Photography

References

General references
"L'Antiquité au goût du jour", Connaissance des Arts, July–August 2012
"J’ai fait un rêve…", Zibeline Magazine, June 2012 
"The Acquisitive Gene", Apollo Magazine, 1 February 2012 
"The French Collection", The Financial Times, 30 December 2011
"Museum opening of the Year Apollo Magazine", Apollo Magazine, 1 December 2011

External links
Official website (English)
Virtual tour of the Mougins Museum of Classical Art provided by Google Arts & Culture

Museums in Alpes-Maritimes
Art museums and galleries in France
Art museums established in 2011
2011 establishments in France